NCCF may refer to:

North Carolina Coastal Federation, a citizen's group for protecting the coasts of the US State of North Carolina
North County Correctional Facility, a maximum security prison in Los Angeles County, California
National Center for Children and Families, an alternate name for the National Center for Children in Poverty.
Nevada Childhood Cancer Foundation